Kenneth Grahame (8 March 1859 – 6 July 1932) was a Scottish writer born in Edinburgh, Scotland. He is most famous for The Wind in the Willows (1908), a classic of children's literature, as well as The Reluctant Dragon. Both books were later adapted for stage and film, of which A. A. Milne's Toad of Toad Hall, based on part of The Wind in the Willows, was the first. Other adaptations include Cosgrove Hall Films' The Wind in the Willows (and its subsequent long-running television series), and the Walt Disney films (The Adventures of Ichabod and Mr. Toad and The Reluctant Dragon).

Personal life

Early life
Kenneth Grahame was born on 8 March 1859 in Edinburgh. When he was a little more than a year old, his father, an advocate, received an appointment as sheriff-substitute in Argyllshire, at Inveraray on Loch Fyne. When he was five, his mother died of scarlet fever, and his father, who had a drinking problem, assigned care of Kenneth, his brother Willie, his sister Helen and the new baby Roland to Granny Ingles, the children's maternal grandmother, in Cookham Dean in the village of Cookham in Berkshire.

There the children lived in a spacious, dilapidated house called The Mount, in expansive grounds, and were introduced to the riverside and boating by their uncle, David Ingles, who was a curate at Cookham Dean church. This ambience, particularly Quarry Wood and the River Thames, is believed by Grahame's biographer Peter Green to have inspired the setting for The Wind in the Willows.

Grahame was an outstanding pupil at St Edward's School, Oxford. In his early years there, no sports regimen had been established and the boys were free to explore the old city and its surroundings.

Career

Grahame wanted to attend Oxford University, but was not allowed to do so by his guardian on grounds of cost. Instead he was sent to work at the Bank of England in 1879, and rose through the ranks until retiring as its Secretary in 1908 due to ill health, which may have been precipitated by a possibly political shooting incident at the bank in 1903. Grahame was shot at three times, but all the shots missed him.

An alternative explanation, given in a letter on display in the Bank museum, is that he had quarrelled with Walter Cunliffe, one of the bank's directors, who would later become Governor of the Bank of England, in the course of which he was heard to say that Cunliffe was "no gentleman". His retirement was enforced ostensibly on health grounds. He was awarded an annual pension of £400, but a worked example on display indicates he was actually due to receive £710.

Marriage and fatherhood
Grahame married Elspeth Thomson, the daughter of Robert William Thomson in 1899. They had one child, a boy named Alastair (nicknamed "Mouse"), who was born blind in one eye and plagued by health problems throughout a short life. On Grahame's retirement, the family returned to Cookham, his childhood home, where they lived at Mayfield, now Herries Preparatory School. There Grahame produced bedtime stories that he told Alastair and turned into The Wind in the Willows. Alastair killed himself on a railway track while an undergraduate at Oxford University on 7 May 1920, five days before his 20th birthday. His demise was recorded as an accidental death out of respect for his father.

According to Cardiff University Professor Emeritus Peter Hunt, Grahame shared a house in London with a set designer, W. Graham Robertson, while Grahame's wife and son lived in Berkshire.

Death
Grahame died in Pangbourne, Berkshire, in 1932. He is buried in Holywell Cemetery, Oxford. Grahame's cousin Anthony Hope, also a successful author, wrote him an epitaph: "To the beautiful memory of Kenneth Grahame, husband of Elspeth and father of Alastair, who passed the river on the 6th of July, 1932, leaving childhood and literature through him the more blest for all time." He was buried side by side with his son in the same grave.

Writing
While still a young man in his twenties, Grahame began to publish light stories in London periodicals such as the St. James Gazette. Some of these were collected and published as Pagan Papers in 1894, and two years later The Golden Age. These were followed by Dream Days in 1898, which contains The Reluctant Dragon.

There is a ten-year gap between Dream Days and the publication of Grahame's triumph, The Wind in the Willows. During that decade, Grahame became a father. The wayward, headstrong nature he saw in his little son Alastair he transformed into the swaggering Mr. Toad, one of its four principal characters. The character in the book known as Ratty was inspired by his good friend, and writer, Sir Arthur Quiller-Couch. Grahame mentions this in a signed copy he gave to Quiller-Couch's daughter, Foy Felicia. Despite its success, he never attempted a sequel. The book is still widely enjoyed by adults and children. It has given rise to many film and television adaptations, while Toad remains one of the most celebrated and beloved characters in children's literature. In 1929, A. A. Milne wrote the play Toad of Toad Hall, which is based on part of The Wind in the Willows, which won the Lewis Carroll Shelf Award in 1958. In the 1990s, William Horwood produced a series of sequels.

Works
Pagan Papers (1894)
The Golden Age (1895)
Dream Days (1898), including "The Reluctant Dragon" (1898)
The Headswoman (1898)
The Wind in the Willows (1908), later illustrated by E. H. Shepard
Bertie's Escapade (1949), illustrated by E. H. Shepard

References

Further reading
Green, Peter, a historian of Hellenistic Greece, wrote a biography of Grahame, Kenneth Grahame 1859–1932. A Study of His Life, Work and Times in 1959, with black and white illustrations, and subsequently the introduction to the Oxford World's Classics edition of The Wind in the Willows. Several abridged versions of the biography with added colour illustrations appeared in the United States and Britain in 1982–1993 under the title Beyond the Wild Wood: The World of Kenneth Grahame Author of The Wind in the Willows  and 
K. Grahame, The Annotated Wind in the Willows, edited with preface and notes by Annie Gauger and Brian Jacques, Norton, .
K. Grahame, The Wind in the Willows: An Annotated Edition, edited by Seth Lerer. Belknap Press/Harvard University Press, .
Alison Prince: Kenneth Grahame: An Innocent in the Wild Wood, London: Allison & Busby, 1994,

External links

www.kennethgrahamesociety.net – online literary society focusing on the life and works of Kenneth Grahame
The Killing of Mr Toad – play by David Gooderson about the moving Grahame family story and its resonances with The Wind in the Willows
Plaque to Kenneth Grahame at Blewbury (Oxfordshire Blue Plaques Board)
Messing About in Boats – amateur boating and boat-building magazine whose name quotes a well-known remark by Ratty to Mole in The Wind in the Willows: "Believe me, my young friend, there is nothing – absolutely nothing – half so much worth doing as simply messing about in boats."

1859 births
1932 deaths
19th-century Scottish writers
20th-century British novelists
20th-century Scottish writers
British children's writers
Burials at Holywell Cemetery
People educated at St Edward's School, Oxford
People from Blewbury
People from Cookham
People from Pangbourne
People from Winkfield
Scottish children's writers
Scottish novelists
Victorian writers
Writers from Edinburgh